John 'Dusty' King (born Miller McLeod Everson, July 11, 1909 – November 11, 1987) was a singer and film actor renowned for his Westerns particularly the Range Busters series.

Biography
Everson was born in Cincinnati, Ohio. A graduate of the University of Cincinnati, Everson travelled the country working a variety of jobs, such as chauffeuring motorcars from Detroit to Cincinnati, lumberjacking in New Mexico, and working as a ranch hand in Arizona.

Everson found himself a radio announcing job in Covington, Kentucky then returned to Cincinnati where he announced, hosted, and sang. Hearing him on the radio, bandleader Ben Bernie hired him as a singer with Everson changing his name to John King. Noting his good looks and popularity, Bernie recommended him to Hollywood with Zeppo Marx also agreeing with Bernie.

Hollywood
King was contracted to Universal Pictures making several films and playing the lead in the serial Ace Drummond. He made appearances in films for other studios before being hired by Monogram Pictures to play the lead in a Cinecolor Western, The Gentleman from Arizona in 1939. The following year King would play "Dusty" in the Range Busters series of Westerns.

The Range Busters were Monogram's version of Republic Pictures' The Three Mesquiteers. King played the singing cowboy alongside of Ray "Crash" Corrigan who was later replaced by David Sharpe and comedy relief Max Terhune with his dummy Elmer for a total of 18 films in the series.

In Haunted Ranch (1943), Sharpe leaves the trio to enlist in the US Army in the Spanish–American War. Not only did Sharpe actually enlist in the US Army Air Forces but King himself was drafted in the USAAF serving in Special Services in Arizona.

After discharge there were no film offers, so King returned to radio, later buying a station. He later left the radio industry to run a waffle shop in La Jolla, California.

Filmography

Notes

External links

 
 King at B Westerns website

1909 births
1987 deaths
American male film actors
Male Western (genre) film actors
Male film serial actors
Male actors from Cincinnati
University of Cincinnati alumni
20th-century American male actors